Henry 'Boeta' Chamberlain (born 22 February 1999) is a South African rugby union player for the  in the Currie Cup and the  in the Rugby Challenge His regular position is fly-half. He was also part of the sharks squad that led the 2020 Super Rugby tournament, starting against the Hurricanes.

References

South African rugby union players
Living people
White South African people
South African people of British descent
1999 births
Rugby union fly-halves
Sharks (Currie Cup) players
Sharks (rugby union) players